The Tilda is a cocktail composed primarily of vodka and ginger beer.

Preparation 
A cocktail shaker is filled with Ice, a triple measure of vodka is added, and topped off with fiery ginger beer (preferably Barritt's Bermuda Stone).

The cocktail is then shaken and poured into a highball glass. A wedge of lime is squeezed and added, and the drink is garnished with a sprig of mint.

References

See also

External links 
 Tilda in cocktails

Cocktails with vodka
Cocktails with ginger beer